Ji or JI may refer to:

Names and titles
 Ji (surname), the pinyin romanization of several distinct Chinese surnames
 Ji (Korean name), a Korean surname and element in given names (including lists of people with the name)
 -ji, an honorific used as a suffix in many languages of India
 J.I the Prince of N.Y, American rapper J.I.
 Ji (or Hou Ji), the legendary founder of the Zhou dynasty

Places in China
 Jì (冀), pinyin abbreviation for the province of Hebei
 Jí (吉), pinyin abbreviation for the province of Jilin
 Ji (state), an ancient Chinese state
 Ji City (disambiguation), several places 
 Ji County (disambiguation), several places
 Ji Prefecture (Shandong), a prefecture in imperial China
 Ji Province, one of the Nine Provinces of ancient China
 Ji River, either of two former rivers

Organizations
 Jamaat-e-Islami (disambiguation), several organizations
 Jemaah Islamiyah (JI), a Southeast Asian militant Islamist rebel group
 Jurong Institute (JI), a now-defunct pre-university institution in Singapore
 JI, IATA code for Meraj Airlines since 2010
 JI, IATA code for Midway Airlines (1993–2003)

Other uses
 Ji (film), a 2005 Indian Tamil film starring Ajith and Trisha Krishnan
 Ji (monk) (632–682), Chinese monk
 Ji (polearm) (戟), a kind of Chinese polearm
 Ji Koizumi, a character in the anime Guru Guru Pon-chan
 Just intonation, an alternative, and often subordinate to the contemporary Western establishment, tuning concept employed in various musical-compositional procedures and theories
 Joint Implementation (JI), one of the flexibility mechanisms of the Kyoto Protocol
 There are two different kana (Japanese script) letters that are romanized as ji:
 じ: Shi (し) with dakuten (voicing marks)
 ぢ: Chi (ち) with dakuten
Tsurumi Line
Hitahikosan Line

See also 
 Jicheng (disambiguation)